The Shadow Realigned remix album by the industrial rock band Godhead, was released on April 29, 2014. The Shadow Realigned was released to co-exist with their 2006 studio release The Shadow Line.  The album features songs from The Shadow Line, remixed by producers the band has become friends with over their career. The last three songs are previously unreleased tracks, including a Depeche Mode cover and a Kiss cover, and an original track.

The album was heavily reviewed, with a widespread agreement that the album was of mixed quality. The remixing was viewed as mostly overly aggressive, making too much use of auto-tune, though "Trapped In Your Lies (Neon Genesis Remix)" was specifically indicated as a high quality exception. The covers were considered to be "interesting musically, but disappointing vocally". The sole new song "To Heal" was good viewed as a good call back to the band's earlier music.

Track listing

References

External links
 Blabbermouth.net
 Guitarworld.com
 Itunes.apple.com

2014 albums
Godhead (band) albums